The Agony of the Eagles (French: L'agonie des aigles) is a 1922 French silent historical film directed by Dominique Bernard-Deschamps and Julien Duvivier and starring Gaby Morlay,  Gilbert Dalleu and Séverin-Mars. It was remade in 1933.

Cast
 Gaby Morlay as Lise Charmoy  
 Gilbert Dalleu as Goglu  
 Séverin-Mars as Napoleon / Colonel de Montander  
 Maxime Desjardins as Commandant Doguereau / Général Petit  
 Fernand Mailly as Chambuque  
 Madame Séverin-Mars as Empress Marie-Louise
 Renée Wilde 
 Jean Rauzena as The King of Rome
 Max Dhartigny as Fortunat  
 Henri Duval as Le Préfet de Police  
 René Maupré as Pascal de Breuilly 
 Thierry Angély 
 Henri Dauvillier as Triaire  
 Ernst Legal as Fouché
 Moreno as Metternich

References

Bibliography
 Klossner, Michael. The Europe of 1500-1815 on Film and Television: A Worldwide Filmography of Over 2550 Works, 1895 Through 2000. McFarland & Company, 2002.

External links

1922 films
1920s historical films
French historical films
French silent feature films
Films directed by Julien Duvivier
Films set in the 1820s
French black-and-white films
Pathé films
Depictions of Napoleon on film
Cultural depictions of Klemens von Metternich
1920s French films